Cruelty may refer to:
 Cruelty, pleasure in inflicting suffering or inaction towards another's suffering
 Cruelty (film), 1959 film from Soviet Union
 Grimmd, a 2016 film from Iceland

See also
 Cruel (disambiguation)